The Rijeka Tunnel, also called TunelRi, is a pedestrian tunnel located in the city centre of Rijeka, Croatia. The tunnel spans  from St. Vitus Cathedral to Dolac Primary School in Old Town. It was originally built from 1939 to 1942 by the Italian military in order to protect civilians from Allied aerial bombings during World War II. In several places along the tunnel, one can still see the original "Riservato all U.N.P.A." ("Reserved for the Anti-aircraft Corps") signs.

After being closed for 75 years, the tunnel was remodeled and opened to the public in 2017, serving as a tourist attraction and public passage. The tunnel has no entrance fee and is open for public access every day from 9 a.m. to 5 p.m.

See also 
 Grič Tunnel

References 

Buildings and structures in Rijeka
Pedestrian tunnels
Tunnels in Croatia
Pedestrian infrastructure in Croatia
Transport in Primorje-Gorski Kotar County
Tunnel